Proto is a national science magazine and website produced by Massachusetts General Hospital in collaboration with Time Inc. The magazine was launched in 2005 and covers news in the field of biomedicine and health care, focusing on basic and clinical research, policy and technology. Recently featured topics include synesthesia, chronic pain policy and aging physicians. The magazine also includes interviews with major figures in the medical world and personal essays about patients’ experiences with health care. Articles from the magazine have been reprinted and cited in a number of well-known venues, including The Washington Post. Proto targets physicians, researchers, policymakers, health care leaders and others with an interest in science and health care.

References
Reprint of "The Social Robot" in The Washington Post
Reprint of "Yes. No. Maybe" in The Washington Post
Reprint of "The Rare Few" in The Washington Post
 Discussion of "The Future of Obesity" on Rush Limbaugh's radio show
Proto the winner of Eddie for Best Full Issue, Single Article, Custom Magazine
Tim Gower's Proto story on repurposing drugs, "Born Again," wins ASJA best business/technology article
 Proto named "Best New Publication/Magazine" in Pearl Awards, 2006
 Proto on ReachMD

External links
Proto magazine homepage

Triannual magazines published in the United States
Science and technology magazines published in the United States
Magazines established in 2005
Magazines published in Boston
Medical magazines
2005 establishments in Massachusetts